Prasophyllum graniticola is a species of orchid endemic to New South Wales. It has a single tubular, shiny dark green leaf and up to twenty five scented, greenish to brownish and white flowers. It is only known from two populations on the Northern Tablelands.

Description
The flowers are sweetly scented and greenish to brownish. As with others in the genus, the flowers are inverted so that the labellum is above the column rather than below it. There is an egg-shaped to wedge-shaped yellow callus with a dark green base in the centre of the labellum and extending well past the bend. Flowering occurs between late November and late December.

Taxonomy and naming
Prasophyllum graniticola was first formally described in 2018 by David Jones and Lachlan Copeland from a specimen collected near Ebor and the description was published in Australian Orchid Review. The specific epithet (graniticola) is derived from the Latin word granum meaning "granite" (amongst other meanings) and the suffix -cola meaning "dweller", referring to the habitat preference of this species, compared to the basaltic soils preferred by the similar P. basalticum.

Distribution and habitat
It is only known from two populations near Ebor.

References

graniticola
Orchids of New South Wales
Endemic orchids of Australia
Plants described in 2018